Bunibonibee Cree Nation, formerly known as Oxford House First Nation and as Oxford House Band of Indians, is a First Nation located along the eastern shoreline of Oxford Lake at the headwaters of the Hayes River and is approximately  northeast of Winnipeg, Manitoba.

The residents are predominantly Woodland Cree and, more specifically Rocky Cree (Asinīskāwiyiniwak). The First Nation is a signatory to the 1909 Treaty 5 Adhesion. Bunibonibee Cree Nation has offices in Oxford House, Manitoba.

The registered population as of August 2013 was 2,892, of which 2,424 resided on their own Indian reserve.

Governance 
The First Nation's governing council are elected under the Indian Act Electoral System, Section 74, of the Indian Act of Canada. consisting of a Chief and six Councillors for a four-year term. The current administration, whose term expires December 4, 2023, are Chief Richard Hart, and Councillors Howard Grieves Jr, Donald Hart, Marion Wood, Anthony Weenusk, Paul Weenusk Sr, and an unfilled Councillor position due to the death of Gabriel Hart on April 16, 2021.

The band council of Bunibonibee Cree Nation, in turn, is a member of Keewatin Tribal Council (KTC), a regional technical/political council; Manitoba Keewatinowi Okimakanak (MKO), a northern regional political council; the Assembly of Manitoba Chiefs (AMC), the provincial political council; and Assembly of First Nations (AFN), the federal political council.

Indian Reserves 
The First Nation have reserved for themselves 13 separate tracts, of which Oxford House 24 IR serves as their main reserve, containing the Settlement of Oxford House, Manitoba.

 High Hill Lake IR — 
 Kisipikamak IR — 
 Munro Lake IR — 
 Notin Sakahekun IR — 
 Opischikonayak Nation IR — 
 Oxford House 24 IR — 
 Oxford House 24A IR — 
 Oxford House 24B IR — 
 Oxford House 24C IR — 
 Oxford House 24D IR — 
 Oxford Lake North Shore IR — 
 Wapisew Lake IR — 
 Whitemud Lake IR —

References

External links
 Bunibonibee Cree Nation profile at Keewatin Tribal Council
 Bunibonibee Cree Nation profile at Indian and Northern Affairs Canada
 Community profile at Kitayan CFDC 
 Oxford House at Weather Network 
 Map of Oxford House 24 at Statcan

Keewatin Tribal Council
First Nations governments in Manitoba